Goodbye, Mr. Chips is a 1969 British musical film directed by Herbert Ross. The screenplay by Terence Rattigan is based on James Hilton's 1934 novel Goodbye, Mr. Chips, which was first adapted for the screen in 1939.

Plot
In 1920s Britain, Arthur Chipping is an established member of the teaching staff at the Brookfield public school. He is a stodgy teacher of Latin, disliked by his pupils, who find him boring and call him "Ditchy," short for "dull as ditch-water." Chips meets Katherine Bridges, a music hall soubrette, in the dining room of the Savoy Hotel in London on the eve of his summer holiday. Dissatisfied with her career and depressed by her romantic entanglements, she sets sail on a Mediterranean cruise and is reunited with Chips by chance in Pompeii. Seeing in him a lonely soul similar to herself, she arranges an evening at the theatre after they return to Britain, and the two find themselves drawn to each other. When Chips arrives at Brookfield for the autumn term, it is with his new wife on his arm, much to the shock of the staff and delight of the pupils, who find Mrs Chips' charm to be irresistible. His marriage softens him and makes him more liked by his students.

Although her close friend and confidante Ursula Mossbank helps Katherine thwart Lord Sutterwick's plan to deprive the school of a generous financial endowment because of the woman's background, her past eventually deprives Chips of his longheld dream of being named headmaster in 1939. Still, the couple's devotion to each other overcomes all obstacles threatening their marriage, extending through 20 years together, when Katherine is killed in 1944 by a German V-1 flying bomb while entertaining the troops at a local Royal Air Force base. Too late for his wife to share in his happiness, Chips was picked as headmaster of Brookfield that same day, and lives out his years at the school, loved by his pupils and comforted by his happy memories.

Cast
 Peter O'Toole as Arthur Chipping, MA (Oxon), Latin Master 
 Petula Clark as Katherine Bridges
 Michael Redgrave as Brookfield Headmaster, MA (Oxon)
 Siân Phillips as Ursula Mossbank
 Michael Bryant as Max Staefel, MA (Oxon), German Master
 George Baker as Lord Sutterwick
 Alison Leggatt as Headmaster's Wife
 Clinton Greyn as Bill Calbury
 Michael Culver as Johnny Longbridge
 Jack Hedley as William Baxter
 Cornelia Frances as the "Dyke"
 Ray Mitchell as Hoofer
 Elspet Gray as Lady Sutterwick (uncredited)

Production notes
A draft of a musical adaptation of Goodbye, Mr. Chips was on file in the MGM script department since 1951. In 1964, with Julie Andrews flush from the success of Mary Poppins, trade magazine advertisements announced she would star opposite Rex Harrison, with Vincente Minnelli listed as director, but nothing came of the project. A few years later, it was back on track with its share of pre-production problems, including several changes in the casting of the lead roles. First, Richard Burton and Samantha Eggar were signed. Then Lee Remick replaced Eggar. Gower Champion, who had replaced Minnelli as director, viewed raw footage of Petula Clark in Finian's Rainbow (1968), fired Remick and replaced her with Clark. Remick sued MGM for damages. Burton balked at playing opposite a "pop singer," and he was replaced by Peter O'Toole. Champion also eventually resigned, and the film ultimately became the first-time directorial effort of choreographer Herbert Ross.

Much of the film was made on location. In Italy, scenes were shot in Campania, Capaccio, Naples, Paestum, Pompeii, and Positano. In London, 59 Strand-on-the-Green in Chiswick served as Katherine's home, and the Salisbury, a popular bar in the West End theatre district, was the setting for a scene in which Chips and Katherine shared a drink after a performance of Medea. Sherborne School in Dorset stood in for Brookfield, and scenes were filmed in the town of Sherborne. This included scenes at Sherborne station where withdrawn 'Brighton line' 4 LAV electric multiple unit train engines, numbers 2924 and 2943, were hauled down in October 1968 for filming before being hauled away for scrapping on 22 October 1968.

Petula Clark's two musical production numbers were choreographed by director Ross' wife Nora Kaye. Ken Adam served as the film's art director, and Julie Harris was responsible for the costume design.

The song score (which replaced one originally composed by André and Dory Previn) is by Leslie Bricusse.

Following the film's initial roadshow bookings, and before it headed into neighborhood theaters, many of the film's musical numbers were deleted, a questionable decision considering many of them were instrumental in explaining the characters' inner thoughts and emotions. They also were eliminated from initial television network broadcasts but have been reinstated for viewings on TCM. Intervening years have brought a new appreciation for it, as well as John Williams' underscore and orchestrations.

The character of Ursula Mossbank has been said to be inspired by actress Tallulah Bankhead.

Differences from novel and 1939 film
Terence Rattigan's screenplay is a major departure from the simple plot of Hilton's novella. The time frame of the original story was advanced by several decades, now starting in the 1920s, continuing through the Second World War, and ending in the late 1960s. Also, it does not show Chipping's first arrival at the Brookfield School, but starts with him already an established member of the teaching staff. Additionally, the character of Katherine Bridges has been transformed into a music hall soubrette. In the earlier 1939 film, as in the novel, Katherine dies in childbirth, after a much shorter marriage.

Music
Music and lyrics by Leslie Bricusse

 "Overture" (Orchestra, conducted by John Williams)
 "Main Titles/Fill the World With Love" (Orchestra and Boys Chorus) (Brookfield school anthem)
 "Where Did My Childhood Go?" (Peter O'Toole)
 "London Is London" (Petula Clark)
 "And the Sky Smiled" (Petula Clark)
 "Apollo" (Petula Clark)
 "When I Am Older" (Boys Chorus)
 "Walk Through the World" (Petula Clark)
 "Fill the World With Love" (Petula Clark, Boys Chorus)
 "Entr'Acte/What Shall I Do With Today?" (Orchestra/Petula Clark)
 "What a Lot of Flowers" (Peter O'Toole)
 "What a Lot of Flowers (Reprise)" (Peter O'Toole)
 "And the Sky Smiled (Reprise)" (Petula Clark)
 "Schooldays" (Petula Clark and Boys)
 "You and I" (Petula Clark)
 "Fill the World With Love (Reprise)" (Peter O'Toole, Boys Chorus)
 "Exit Music - You and I" (Orchestra)
 "When I Was Younger"  (Peter O'Toole) (Deleted from film but included on original soundtrack recording)

A limited-edition 3-CD set of the complete score, including alternative versions and discarded numbers, was released by the Film Score Monthly Silver Age Classics label in 2006. "You and I" remains a staple of Petula Clark's concert repertoire.

Reception

Critical response
For the most part the reviews were lukewarm, although both O'Toole and Clark were universally praised for their performances and the obvious chemistry between them. According to Seventeen, "Rarely have a pair of players been so marvelously in tune with each other as Peter O'Toole and Petula Clark."

In his review in The New York Times, Vincent Canby said, "[Peter O'Toole] has never been better. Having been forced to abandon his usual mechanical flamboyance, he gives Chips an air of genuine, if seedy, grandeur that shines through dozens of make-up changes… Miss Clark is a fine rock singer with the quality of a somewhat tough Julie Andrews (which I like and is not to be confused with Miss Andrews's steely cool)… The film is the first directorial effort of Herbert Ross…the sort of director who depends heavily on the use of the zoom, the boom and the helicopter, which gives the movie the contradictory look of a mod-Victorian valentine…[he] has handled the musical sequences…more or less as soliloquies. O'Toole talks his with such charm that I almost suspected he was lip-syncing Rex Harrison's voice, and Miss Clark belts hers in good, modified Streisand style."

Roger Ebert of the Chicago Sun-Times observed, "Goodbye, Mr. Chips uses its budget quietly, with good taste, and succeeds in being a big movie without being a gross one. I think I enjoyed it about as much as any road show since Funny Girl. And that surprised me, since so much of the critical reaction has been negative. Even at its worst, Chips is inoffensive in its sentimentality. At its best, it's the first film since The Two of Us that I genuinely feel deserves to be called heartwarming…the Hilton story was a best seller but hardly a work of art. By modernizing the action, Rattigan has made it possible for the movie to mirror changes in the English class structure during the two decades when it was most obviously becoming obsolete… As the schoolmaster and his wife, Peter O'Toole and Petula Clark are exactly right. O'Toole succeeds in creating a character that is aloof, chillingly correct, terribly reserved—and charming all the same…Miss Clark carries most of the musical duties in the film, and carries them well…one of the best things about Chips is that Ross has concentrated on telling his story, and hasn't let the songs intrude."

In Holiday magazine, Rex Reed enthused, "I think I'm in love with Petula Clark. If she had come along twenty years ago, a time the screen knew a mercurial presence when it saw one, she would have been a much bigger star than she ever has a chance of being now. The playing is superb. Peter O'Toole is a prim and angular Chips who wears a look of permanent insecurity; Miss Clark is a soft, sweet-smelling, dimpled doughnut with powdery cheeks and witty anxiety, like a new Jean Arthur. Together they are perfect counterparts… Goodbye, Mr. Chips is, I'm afraid, very square indeed, but thanks to an idyllic cast and a magnificent director, there is so much love and beauty in it that it made my heart stop with joy. I found it all quite irresistible."

Archer Winsten of the New York Post stated, "[It] has been produced in England in surroundings of inevitable authenticity and taste, with performers of extraordinary talent and range, and the results are here for all of us to share the sentimental warmth…that O'Toole performance is a gem, and Petula Clark knows exactly how to enhance its brilliance, and her own, most effectively."

In Life, Richard Schickel wrote "Petula Clark…is fresh and charming. Together with O’Toole she provides the firm, bright core for a film always in danger of becoming mushy. Nearly unaided, they make the old thing work—and make it worthwhile."

A reviewer for the British Channel 4 feels "the main problem with turning the film into a musical is that the songs lack the emotion that the story really needs… That said, O'Toole is superb as Chips and Clark charming as the woman who dramatically changes his life."

Accolades

 Of note, Peter O'Toole and Siân Phillips, who had been married for years at the time of this film, had multiple nominations for their performances.

Home media
The film was released in anamorphic widescreen format on Region 1 DVD by Warner Home Video on January 29, 2009. It has audio tracks in English and Japanese and subtitles in English, French, Japanese, and Thai. The only bonus features are the trailers for the 1939 and 1969 films.

Comic book adaption
 Gold Key: Goodbye, Mr. Chips (June 1970)

See also
 List of British films of 1969
 Goodbye, Mr. Chips (1939 film)

Notes

References

External links
 
 
 
 
 Goodbye, Mr. Chips at the official Petula Clark website

1969 films
1960s musical drama films
British musical drama films
1969 directorial debut films
Films directed by Herbert Ross
Films about educators
Films about teacher–student relationships
Films based on British novels
Films featuring a Best Musical or Comedy Actor Golden Globe winning performance
Metro-Goldwyn-Mayer films
Compositions by Leslie Bricusse
Films scored by John Williams
Films set in England
Films set in boarding schools
Films with screenplays by Terence Rattigan
Films adapted into comics
1969 drama films
Films shot at MGM-British Studios
1960s English-language films
1960s British films